Oslo Beach is a suburb of Port Shepstone in KwaZulu-Natal, South Africa. It is part of the KZN South Coast region. It is located on the southern outskirts of Port Shepstone and located north of Shelly Beach.

Oslo Beach is located along the R620 regional route to Port Shepstone and Margate and is also located the terminus of the route.

Facilities 
Oslo Beach has two schools, Creston College  and Suid-Natal Primere Skool which is an Afrikaans school. Most schools in the Lower South Coast are in Port Shepstone and Margate.

There are no shopping malls in Oslo Beach and so the nearest ones are either in Port Shepstone CBD or Shelly Beach or even further to Margate.

In terms of medical facilities, the nearest public hospital is the Port Shepstone Regional Hospital and the nearest private hospital is the Hibiscus Private Hospital which is also in Port Shepstone.

References

Populated places in the Ray Nkonyeni Local Municipality
Suburbs in South Africa
KwaZulu-Natal South Coast